Ballyroan may refer to:

Places 
 Ballyroan, Dublin, a suburb of Dublin in Ireland
 Ballyroan, County Laois, a town in Ireland

Sport 
 Ballyroan GAA, a former gaelic football club in Ireland
 Ballyroan Abbey GAA, the football club that replaced Ballyroan GAA, above
 Ballyroan Stakes, an annual horse race at Leopardstown Racecourse in Ireland